Fuzhou railway station may refer to:

 Fuzhou railway station (福州站), a railway station in Fuzhou, Fujian, China.
 Fuzhou railway station (Jiangxi) (抚州站), a railway station in Fuzhou, Jiangxi, China.
 Fuzhou railway station (New Taipei) (浮州站), a railway station in New Taipei, Taiwan, China.